Bon Voyage may refer to:

Bon voyage, a French phrase borrowed into English, usually translated as "have a nice trip".

Film and television
 Bon Voyage (1933 film), a German musical film directed by 	Alfred Abel
 Bon Voyage (1944 film), a short propaganda film by Alfred Hitchcock
 Bon Voyage (1954 film), a West German musical film
 Bon Voyage, a 1958 Filipino film starring Fernando Poe Jr.
 Bon Voyage! (1962 film), a Disney family film and comic book
 Bon Voyage (2003 film), a World War II drama
 Bon Voyage (2016 film), a Swiss-German short film
 Bon Voyage, Charlie Brown (and Don't Come Back!!), a 1980 animated film
 "Bon Voyage" (Gilmore Girls), the finale episode of the TV series Gilmore Girls
 Bon Voyage, 2016–2019 variety show by boy-band BTS

Music
Bon Voyage!, composition by Charles Harford Lloyd (1849–1919)
 Bon Voyage (band), a musical group

Albums
 Bon Voyage (Anna Rossinelli album), 2011
 Bon Voyage (McCoy Tyner album), 1987
 Bon Voyage (Koda Kumi album), 2014
 Bon Voyage (Melody's Echo Chamber album), 2018

Songs
 "Bon Voyage", song by Henri Salvador, recorded by
 Jocelyne Jocya (1942–2003), 1958
 Gloria Lasso (1922–2005), 1959
 "Bon Voyage" (The Little Heroes song), 1983
 "Bon Voyage" (Deichkind song), 2000
 "BON VOYAGE!" (Bon-Bon Blanco song), 4th theme song for the anime series One Piece, 2004

Other uses
 Bon Voyage! (shop), a Disney goods specialty shop in Japan
 The Sims 2: Bon Voyage, a 2007 expansion pack for the computer game The Sims 2

See also
 Bomb Voyage, a character in the film The Incredibles